The Buenos Aires Rugby Union, usually referred as URBA, is the Argentine governing body that organises and controls the rugby union in the Buenos Aires Province (including the main district, Buenos Aires autonomous city and one team from Rosario, Santa Fé). The remaining clubs from the province are distributed amongst four other unions: Unión de Rugby del Oeste de Buenos Aires in the west, Unión de Rugby del Centro de la Provincia de Buenos Aires in the centre, Unión de Rugby de Mar del Plata in the east, and Unión de Rugby del Sur in the south.

URBA is the largest union of Argentina, with 76 clubs directly affiliated and 15 competing as guests. Those teams compete in 7 competitions organised by the body, including the Top 13, the oldest competition in Argentina with the first championship being held in 1899.

The Union also controls its representative team, which is the most winning side of defunct Campeonato Argentino with 37 titles.

History 

The "River Plate Rugby Union" (RPRU) was established in 1899 in Buenos Aires by four clubs, Buenos Aires F.C., Belgrano A.C., Lomas A.C. and Rosario A.C. The body organized the first edition of the Buenos Aires' inter-club competition that same year, with Lomas being the first Argentine champion. In 1951, the change of name to Spanish "Unión Argentina de Rugby", was after a request by the Argentine Olympic committee and it continued at the same time to work as local federation of Buenos Aires clubs, and national federation, recognized by International Rugby Board.

As a result of a restructuring of the Argentine rugby in 1995, the "Unión de Rugby de Buenos Aires" was created with the purpose of organising competitions in the city district and nearest towns like San Isidro and La Plata, while the remaining part of the Buenos Aires Province (including populous cities like Mar del Plata or Tandil) remained under other provincial unions. Therefore, the RPRU championship was renamed "Torneo de la URBA" and continued with the same format, while the Argentine Union (UAR) took over national teams only.

Competitions 
As of 2021, several competitions are organized by the URBA. The first division is the Top 13, contested by 12 clubs of the Buenos Aires area and also the oldest rugby competition in Argentina, with its first edition held in 1899.

The URBA league system completes with Primera A (unlike its name indicates, it is the second division), Primera B (third), Primera C (fourth), Segunda (fifth), Tercera (sixth) and Desarrollo (seven, the lowest level).

Primera A to Segunda have 14 teams competing in each division, while there are 12 teams in Tercera and 11 in Desarrollo.

Other competitions organized by the URBA are "Universitario" (with 22 University teams playing in two divisions), "Femenino" (16 female teams in two divisions), and "Empresarial" (27 teams in two divisions). The URBA has also competitions for U19, U17, U16 and U15 teams.

Union team 

The Buenos Aires team –nicknamed Las Águilas (The Eagles)– is the most successful within the provincial teams in Argentina, having won a record 37 Campeonato Argentino titles.

Titles

Domestic 
Campeonato Argentino (37): 1962, 1963, 1964, 1966, 1967, 1968, 1969, 1970, 1971, 1972, 1973, 1974, 1975, 1976, 1977, 1978, 1979, 1980, 1981, 1982, 1983, 1984, 1986, 1991, 1994, 1996, 1998, 1999, 2000, 2002, 2003, 2006, 2007, 2008, 2015, 2016, 2017

International 
World Club Sevens (1): 2014

International friendly competition 
The URBA team has also played several international friendly matches against national teams that were touring Argentina, with several wins against some of them. Below is the list of matches won:

References

External links 
 

B
B
Sports organizations established in 1995
1995 establishments in Argentina